The Reykjavík Marathon is an annual marathon set in Reykjavík, Iceland, held to coincide with the city's Cultural Night Festival in mid-August. It has taken place every year since 1984.  Along with the full marathon a half marathon and several races of shorter distances are arranged. In 2011 a total of 12,481 people competed in the various events that were held, 595 solely in the full marathon.

Since 2006 the marathon has been sponsored by the Icelandic bank Íslandsbanki, known as Glitnir between 2006 and 2009.

Past winners (marathon) 
Key:

Past winners (Half marathon)
Key:

Homepage
 Official Site

References 

Marathons in Europe
Recurring sporting events established in 1984
Sports competitions in Reykjavík
Athletics competitions in Iceland
1984 establishments in Iceland
August sporting events
Summer events in Iceland